Juhan Smuul (18 February 1922 – 13 April 1971) was an Estonian writer. Until 1954 he used the given name Johannes Schmuul.

Career
Smuul was born in Koguva village on the island of Muhu to Jüri and Ruudu Schmuul (née Tuulik). He had three older sisters: Salme, Linda, and Liisa and one younger sister, Aliide, as well as six half-siblings from his father's first marriage.

He wrote several novels, often based on life in his native island. He also authored several travelogues. His most famous is The Frozen Book (Jäine raamat), about a Soviet expedition to Antarctica. Smuul also wrote four screenplays. They are:
Kirjad Sõgedate külast (1966)
Keskpäevane praam (1967)
Metskapten (1971)
Siin me oleme! (1979) (TV)

He also worked in Soviet Estonian journalism. He died in Tallinn.

Recognition
Smuul was named People's Writer of the Estonian SSR in 1965. He was also awarded the Stalin Prize in 1952 and the Lenin Prize in 1961.

The literary award of the Estonian SSR (Eesti NSV kirjanduse aastapreemia) was named after him in 1972 and became the Juhan Smuul literary award from then on.

The Smuul family home, Tooma farm, located in Koguva village, is a museum.

Personal life
Juhan Smuul was married first to translator Ita Saks from 1945 until 1951. After divorcing, he married poet Debora Vaarandi. Before his death, he lived for three or four years with radio and Finnish-language television editor  Ellen Nood. He had no children.

References

External links

Juhan Smuul unustas “Poeemi Stalinile” käsikirja Moskva rongi. Õhtuleht. 2000-08-11.

1922 births
1971 deaths
People from Muhu Parish
Communist Party of the Soviet Union members
Fifth convocation members of the Supreme Soviet of the Soviet Union
Sixth convocation members of the Supreme Soviet of the Soviet Union
Members of the Central Committee of the Communist Party of Estonia
Members of the Supreme Soviet of the Estonian Soviet Socialist Republic
Estonian male novelists
Estonian male poets
Estonian screenwriters
Soviet screenwriters
Male screenwriters
20th-century Estonian novelists
20th-century Estonian poets
People's Writers of the Estonian SSR
Lenin Prize winners
Stalin Prize winners
Burials at Metsakalmistu